Swarga Devatha is a 1980 Indian Malayalam film,  directed by Charles Ayyampally. The film stars Sharada, K. P. Ummer, Seema and Sudheer in the lead roles. The film has musical score by M. S. Viswanathan.

Cast
Sharada
K. P. Ummer
Seema
Sudheer
Vincent

Soundtrack
The music was composed by M. S. Viswanathan and the lyrics were written by Mankombu Gopalakrishnan.

References

External links
 

1980 films
1980s Malayalam-language films
Films scored by M. S. Viswanathan